Renfe, officially Renfe-Operadora, is the national passenger railway company of Spain. 

It was created in 2005 upon the split of the former Renfe national company into the Administrador de Infraestructuras Ferroviarias (which inherited the infrastructure) and Renfe-Operadora (which inherited the railway service).

History 

The name "Renfe" (acronym of Red Nacional de los Ferrocarriles Españoles) is derived from that of the former Spanish National Railway Network created on 24 January 1941 with the nationalisation of Spain's railways. As per EU Directive 91/440, Renfe was divided into Renfe-Operadora (operations) and ADIF (infrastructure) on 1 January 2005. At the same time, the existing RENFE double-arrowed logo (nicknamed the "galleta", Spanish for biscuit), first introduced in 1971 and given a facelift in 1983, with a sans-serif font, and again in 2000, with a mixed-case italic font, has been replaced by a dark purple lower-case wordmark designed by Interbrand, and also replaces some of the separate logos used by the other sectors, although the old Renfe logo remains in use in some stations in Spain and on maps to indicate an ADIF station.

The Railway Sector Act, 2003 separated the management, maintenance and construction of rail infrastructure from train operation. The first activity is now the responsibility of Administrador de Infraestructuras Ferroviarias (ADIF), the legal successor of RENFE, while the newly created Renfe-Operadora (commercial name "Renfe Operadora" or simply "Renfe") owns the rolling stock and remains responsible for the planning, marketing and operation of passenger and freight services (though no longer with a legal monopoly).

Renfe no longer has a monopoly on domestic passenger services. Ouigo España launched competing trains on the Madrid–Barcelona route in 2021, followed by Iryo in 2022.

Structure
Renfe Operadora inherited the management model of the business units of the old Renfe, which made Renfe Operadora responsible for the operation of the following passenger and freight services. In January 2006, Renfe Operadora restructured the main business units into four:

 Dirección General de Servicios Públicos de Cercanías y Media Distancia (General Public Utilities Directorate for Suburban and Medium Distance): responsible for commuter services (Cercanías), medium-distance high-speed rail AVE services and medium-range regional services (:es:Regionales and :es:Media Distancia). However, control of some Cercanías services were transferred to Spain's Autonomous communities.
 Dirección General de Servicios de Larga Distancia (General Directorate of Long Distance Services): responsible for long-distance intercity and high-speed rail services (except medium-distance AVE services and Media Distancia, which is managed by the above business unit).
 Dirección General de Servicios de Mercancías y Logística (General Directorate for Freight and Logistics Services): responsible for freight services.
 Dirección General de Fabricación y Mantenimiento (General Directorate of Manufacturing and Maintenance): responsible for rolling stock maintenance and manufacture (also known as Integria)

The Spanish state railways are currently engaged in a transformation and modernisation project. Key to this effort is a major overhaul of their out-dated ICT (information and communication technology) systems through an ICT renewal project scheduled for completion at the end of 2010 under the responsibility of Corporate Director of Information Systems Óscar Gómez Barbero. So far, the company has introduced improvements to their internet ticket sales and adopted new ICT management practices within a "more industrial" organisational model, though Mr. Gomez has publicly acknowledged the difficulties in transforming what still remains a very hierarchical organisation.

In June 2013, Renfe's board agreed to restructure the organisation into four separate companies, responsible for:
 Operating passenger trains;
 Freight;
 Rolling stock maintenance;
 Train leasing
These four would be underneath a single holding company.

Figures

Operations 
For this reason, the  gauge is generally termed "European gauge" in Spain.

The Spanish high-speed system is called AVE (Alta Velocidad Española, meaning "Spanish High Speed"). The logo incorporates a feature which resembles a bird (ave in Spanish). The high-speed lines are built to the standard European gauge.

Construction of the high-speed rail line between Madrid and Seville began in 1988 and operation commenced in 1991. The second high-speed rail line (Madrid to Barcelona) was completed in 2007 with the inaugural service commencing at 06:00 on 20 February 2008. The greater part of the line (Madrid to Lleida) was placed into service on 11 October 2003, with connection to Huesca from Zaragoza. The third high-speed line (Madrid to Toledo) was opened in November 2005, followed by the spur from Córdoba to Málaga as far as Antequera in 2007. Another high-speed route from Madrid to Valladolid was opened in 2007, the line from Madrid to Valencia was opened in 2010 and the first stage of the high-speed line in Galicia opened in 2011. A line to Lisbon is being designed.

Other lines operated by Renfe include Euromed, a moderate-speed line between Barcelona and Alicante.

In addition to intercity transport, Renfe operates commuter train systems, known as Cercanías (or Rodalies in Catalonia and Cercanías-Aldirikoak in the Basque Country), in eleven metropolitan areas, including Madrid and Barcelona. In some cities, Renfe shares the market with other commuter railway operators, such as FGC in Barcelona.

In 2019, Renfe solicited bids for 31 new trains for the Asturias and Cantabria regions and the €258m contract was awarded to CAF (Construcciones y Auxiliar de Ferrocarriles) in June 2020. Around February 2023, authorities discovered the designs were for the wrong loading gauge,  and would be too wide for the tunnels,  because the tunnels in the region were built in the 19th century, and do not accommodate recent standard train sizes. Amidst international embarrassment, rail operator Renfe and track company Adif each tried to deflect responsibility; each fired one official, but some called for higher-ups to be fired. Fortunately the trains were still in the design phase, however the Cercanía commuter trains will be delayed by at least two years, until 2026. Subsequently transport officials including the president of RENF and the Secretary of State for transport resigned.

Passenger rolling stock 
Renfe Operadora utilises the following rolling stock and commercial products inside of its two divisions:

Suburban and Medium Distance (DGSPCMD)

Cercanías AM (Meter Gauge Commuter Services)

Cercanías (Commuter Services)

Mainline Medium Distance Services

High-Speed Medium Distance Services

Long Distance (DGSLD)

Luxury Tourist Train Services

Mainline Long Distance Services

High-Speed Long Distance Services

Prototype Rolling Stock

Future Rolling Stock

Vehicles register numbers 
All classes are designated by three numbers. The first digit has a special meaning:
 1xx: High speed multiple unit
 2xx: Electric locomotive
 3xx: Diesel locomotive
 4xx: Electric multiple unit (EMU)
 5xx: Diesel multiple unit (DMU)
 6xx: Hybrid locomotive
 7xx: Hybrid multiple unit (HMU)
 8xx: Trams which can run on railways

See also 
 Renfe Feve
 History of rail transport in Spain
 Rail transport in Spain
 Transport in Spain

Notes 
1.Operated by CP in Portugal.
2.Managed by Elipsos under the brand Renfe-SNCF en Cooperación/en Coopération.

References

External links 

 Train tickets from France and Spain
 
 

 
Railway companies of Spain
Companies based in the Community of Madrid
Government-owned companies of Spain
Spanish brands
Spanish companies established in 2005
Railway companies established in 2005